Deira Clocktower, originally referred to as the Dubai Clock Tower, is a roundabout in Deira, Dubai, United Arab Emirates (UAE).

The Telegraph newspaper listed Dubai Clock Tower among the 17 most beautiful clock towers around the world.

Location 
Dubai Clock Tower is located at the intersection of Umm Hurair Road and route D 89 (Al Maktoum Road) in the locality of Al Rigga. Now a prominent monument in Deira, the roundabout provides access to the Al Maktoum Bridge, the first land crossing constructed between Deira and Bur Dubai. The surrounding area is commercially important, and includes the offices of major international airlines operating in UAE.

It can be reached by Dubai Metro. The nearest metro station is Al-Rigga on the Red Line.

History

The Dubai Clock Tower was built in 1965 and was designed by Otto Bullard and Ziki Homsi, a partner at Architecture Design Construction (ADC) Office. It was erected as a symbol of Dubai and located in Deira because major routes into Dubai converged prior to the building of Dubai–Abu Dhabi Road.

Engineer Edgar Bublik, who was General Manager of Overseas AST in Dubai in the 1970s, explains the background of the Dubai Clock Tower:

“Shaikh Ahmed of Qatar was Shaikh Rashid’s son-in-law. In the early 1960s Shaikh Ahmed gave Shaikh Rashid a clock as a gift. It was a very large clock. Shaikh Rashid did not know what to do with such a large clock! My predecessor Mr Bulard had just completed building Zabeel Palace for Shaikh Rashid so he made a sketch of his idea for a Clock Tower. Mr Bulard gave the sketch to his engineer to make the structural calculations and produce a design. The shape and design of the Clock Tower was from Mr Bulard’s own ideas and did not represent an Oil Drilling Bit or any other object.”

Bahria Town built replica of Deira Clock tower in Bahria Town Lahore Pakistan called Bahria Clock Tower.

References 

Buildings and structures in Dubai
Clock towers in the United Arab Emirates